Eugenio Bertini (8 November 1846  – 24 February 1933) was an Italian mathematician who introduced Bertini's theorem. He was born at Forlì and died at Pisa.

Selected works

References

Bertini and his two fundamental theorems by Steven L. Kleiman, on the life and works of Eugenio Bertini

1846 births
1933 deaths
People from Forlì
19th-century Italian mathematicians
20th-century Italian mathematicians
University of Pisa alumni
Academic staff of the University of Pisa